Josef Drahoňovský (27 March 1877 – 20 July 1938) was a Czech sculptor. His work was part of the sculpture event in the art competition at the 1932 Summer Olympics.

References

1877 births
1938 deaths
20th-century Czech sculptors
20th-century male artists
Czech male sculptors
Olympic competitors in art competitions
People from Turnov